The 1969 Harvard Crimson football team was an American football team that represented Harvard University during the 1969 NCAA University Division football season. After gaining a share of the Ivy League crown the previous year, Harvard fell to a fifth-place tie in 1969.

In their 13th year under head coach John Yovicsin, the Crimson compiled a 3–6 record and were outscored 166 to 165. John F. Cramer was the team captain.

Harvard's 2–5 conference record tied for fifth-best in the Ivy League standings. The Crimson were outscored 153 to 142 by Ivy opponents. 

Harvard played its home games at Harvard Stadium in the Allston neighborhood of Boston, Massachusetts.

Schedule

References

Harvard
Harvard Crimson football seasons
Harvard Crimson football
1960s in Boston